San Carlos Minas is a small town in  Córdoba Province in Argentina, it is the head town of the Minas Department. It has a population of 2000 people. It was found in 1 of October 1854.
San Carlos Minas is near of two rivers Noguinet and Jaime.

External links

Photos and Information of San Carlos Minas

Populated places in Córdoba Province, Argentina